The Surinamese Land Forces is the land component of the Suriname National Army (SNA). It is the largest service branch of the Suriname National Army.

Organization 
The army consists of some 1,000 personnel and has 4 division. The current commander of the Surinamese Land Forces is Lieutenant Colonel Ashok Jagdew.

History 
Upon independence in 1975, the Military of Suriname became Surinamese Armed Forces. After a coup on February 25, 1980, the armed forces became the National Army. In 1980 the Surinamese Land Forces was formed as a division of the Suriname National Army.

Equipment

Army

References 

 

Suriname
Government of Suriname
Military of Suriname